Parchestan-e Al Kalu (also Romanized as Parchestān-e Āl Kalu; also known as Parchestān, Parchestān-e Āl Kalī, and Perchestān) is a village in Shahid Modarres Rural District, in the Central District of Shushtar County, Khuzestan Province, Iran. At the 2006 census, its population was 13, in 4 families.

References 

Populated places in Shushtar County